Kalevi may refer to

 Kalevi (mythology), an ancient Finnish and Estonian ruler, known from the Finnish epic Kalevala and Estonian epic Kalevipoeg.
 Kalevi, Estonia, a village in Estonia
 Kalevi (given name), a Finnish and Estonian given name (including a list of people with the name)